The Sunshine Millions Dash is an American race for thoroughbred horses held in January as part of the eight-race Sunshine Millions series. Run at Santa Anita Park in Arcadia, California or at Gulfstream Park in Hallandale Beach, Florida.  Half the eight races of the Sunshine Millions series are run at one track and half at the other.

Open to three-year-olds willing to race six furlongs on the dirt, the Dash is an ungraded stakes event but carries a purse of $250,000.  This race is also known as the Ocala Stud Dash Stakes.

The Sunshine Millions series of races are restricted to horses bred either in Florida or in California and is the brainchild of the Thoroughbred Owners of California, the California Thoroughbred Breeders Association, the Florida Thoroughbred Breeders' and Owners' Association, Inc., Santa Anita Park, Gulfstream Park, and Magna Entertainment Corp.

Winners

References
 Official site of the Sunshine Millions

Restricted stakes races in the United States
Horse races in the United States
Triple Crown Prep Races
Flat horse races for three-year-olds